Fibromuscular dysplasia (FMD) is a non-atherosclerotic, non-inflammatory disease of the blood vessels that causes abnormal growth within the wall of an artery. FMD has been found in nearly every arterial bed in the body although the most common arteries affected are the renal and carotid arteries.

There are various types of FMD, with multi-focal fibroplasia being the most common. Further, less common, forms of the disease include focal (previously known as intimal) and adventitial fibroplasia. FMD predominantly affects middle-aged women, but has been found in men and people of all ages. Pediatric cases of FMD are vastly different from that of the adult population, and poorly studied. The prevalence of FMD is not known and, although the disease was initially thought to be rare, some studies have suggested that it may be underdiagnosed.

Signs and symptoms
The symptoms expressed by FMD patients are largely dependent on the vascular bed(s) affected by the disease. Patients may also be entirely asymptomatic and have FMD discovered incidentally (e.g., when imaging studies are performed for other reasons). In a study from the United States Registry for Fibromuscular Dysplasia, the median age at first symptom was roughly 47 years.

Renal arteries
The main symptoms associated with renal FMD are secondary hypertension and bruits that can be heard with a stethoscope over the abdomen or flanks. Complications such as aneurysms, dissections, or occlusion of the renal artery have been associated with renal artery FMD.

Cerebrovascular regions

The carotid and vertebral arteries are most commonly affected. Middle and distal regions of the internal carotid arteries are frequently involved. Patients with FMD in the carotid arteries typically present around 50 years of age. Symptoms of craniocervical involvement include headaches (mostly migraine), pulsatile tinnitus, dizziness, and neck pain, although patients are often asymptomatic. On physical examination, one may detect neurological symptoms secondary to a stroke or transient ischemic attack (TIA), a bruit over an affected artery, and diminished distal pulses. Complications of cerebrovascular FMD include TIA, ischemic stroke, Horner syndrome, or subarachnoid hemorrhage.

Other sites

Patients with mesenteric, or intestinal FMD, may experience abdominal pain after eating or weight loss. FMD within the extremities may cause claudication or may be detectable by bruits. If the lower limb arteries are affected, the patient may present with cold legs or evidence of distal embolic disease. FMD present in the subclavian artery may cause arm weakness, paresthesia, claudication, and subclavial steal syndrome.

Children
Children with FMD often report various non-specific symptoms or present with hypertension during routine physical examinations. Symptoms are commonly associated with the artery being affected. Symptoms may include headaches, insomnia, fatigue and chest or abdominal pain. FMD affecting the arteries of the head & neck is commonly recognized as a cause of childhood strokes.

Detection may stem from a bruit being present over the affected vascular bed during a physical assessment. Yet, absence of a bruit does not rule out significant vascular disease.

In children, renovascular disease accounts for approximately 10% of all causes of secondary hypertension. Kidney failure is a common presentation in infants and children but is uncommon in adults, although it is occasionally the presenting problem in adults with focal disease. “The presentation in infants and children younger than 4 years is especially likely to resemble vacuities.”

Related diseases
The vascular subtype of Ehlers-Danlos Syndrome (type IV) has been associated with multi-focal FMD. This syndrome should be suspected in patients with multiple aneurysms and/or tears (dissections) in arteries in addition to the typical angiographic findings of FMD. There have been isolated reports of FMD associated with other disorders, including Alport syndrome, pheochromocytoma, Marfan syndrome, Moyamoya disease, and Takayasu's arteritis.

Cause
While the cause of FMD remains unclear, current theory suggests that there may be a genetic predisposition as case reports have identified clusters of the disease and prevalence among twins. In fact, according to the Cleveland Clinic approximately 10% of cases appear to be inherited and often coexists with other genetic abnormalities that affect the blood vessels. Approximately 10% of patients with FMD have an affected family member. A study conducted from the patient registry at Michigan Cardiovascular Outcomes Research and Reporting Program (MCORRP) at the University of Michigan Health System reported a high prevalence of a family history of stroke (53.5%), aneurysm (23.5%), and sudden death (19.8%).  Even though FMD is a non-atherosclerotic disease family histories of hypertension and hyperlipidemia were also common among those diagnosed with FMD. It is believed that the cause of FMD is not a single identifier such as genetics but has multiple underlying factors. Theories of hormonal influence, mechanical stress from trauma and stress to the artery walls, and also the effect of loss of oxygen supply to the blood vessel wall caused by fibrous lesions. It has been suggested that environmental factors, such as smoking and estrogen, may play a role in addition to genetic factors, however concerns for safety associated with exogenous female hormones in FMD remain theorectical.

Pathophysiology
FMD can be found in almost every artery in the human body, but most often affects the carotid, vertebral, renal arteries and even those that supply the intestines, arms, and legs.  Patients may present with FMD in multiple vessels. FMD has been pathologically categorized into three types of classifications:  Multi-focal, focal, and adventitial; referring to the particular layer of arterial wall being affected.

Focal

In pediatrics, the most prevalent form of FMD is focal fibroplasia. Focal fibroplasia is described as long, narrow, irregular or smooth focal stenosis and can occur in any arterial bed. Whilst it is the most common type amongst children, it only accounts for approximately 10% of FMD cases overall. It most often presents with ischemic symptoms, and frequently mistaken for Takayasu arteritis. (previously known as intimal)

Multi-focal

The second type, multi-focal fibroplasia, involves thickening of the media and collagen formation. It is typically reported as having the appearance of a ‘string of beads’ on angiographic review.  "The 'bead' component is often larger than the normal arterial lumen, and in a subset of patients with FMD, aneurysms are present that may require treatment."  The multi-focal subtype of FMD accounts for nearly 80% to 90% of all FMD cases. (previously known as medial)

Adventitial

The third classification is adventitial fibroplasia, in which collagen replaces the fibrous adventitia and extends beyond the artery. This form is considered rare but angiographic appearance may look similar to the focal subtype of FMD, making the distinction difficult.

Diagnosis
It is the lack of specific symptoms and their potential to appear anywhere that makes FMD a challenge to detect early on. The most accurate diagnosis comes from combining clinical presentation and angiographic imaging. According to the Michigan Cardiovascular Outcomes Research and Reporting Program (MCORRP, 2013) the length of time from a patient’s first signs or symptoms to diagnosis is commonly 5 years.

FMD is currently diagnosed through the use of both invasive and non-invasive tests. Non-invasive testing includes duplex ultrasonography, magnetic resonance angiography (MRA), and computed tomography angiography (CTA).  Invasive testing through angiography is the gold standard. However, due to the higher risk of complications, this is typically not done early on. Occasionally, FMD is diagnosed asymptomatically after an unrelated x-ray presents the classic ‘string of beads’ appearance of the arteries, or when a practitioner investigates an unexpected bruit found during an exam. When a diagnosis of FMD is considered for a patient thorough medical history, family history, as well as vascular examination, should be completed.

A definitive diagnosis of FMD can only be made with imaging studies. Catheter-based angiography (with contrast) has proven to be the most accurate imaging technique: this test involves a catheter is inserted into a large artery and advanced until it reaches the vessel of question.  The catheter allows practitioners to view and measure the pressure of the artery aiding in the categorization and severity of the FMD diseased artery. According to Olin, “catheter-based angiography is the only imaging modality that can accurately identify the changes of FMD, aneurysm formation, and dissection in the branch vessels.” Practitioners believe it is important to utilize IVUS imaging because stenosis can sometimes only be detected through the methods of pressure gradient or IVUS imaging.  In addition, computed tomography angiography and magnetic resonance angiography are commonly used to evaluate arteries in the brain. Doppler ultrasound may be used in both the diagnosis and follow-up of FMD.

Similar diseases
 In the visceral distribution, Segmental arterial mediolysis may mimic FMD.
 In the visceral and cerebrovascular distribution, atherosclerosis must be considered.

Children
The differentiating presentations are suggestive of FMD being a unique syndrome in respect to the pediatric population. Experienced FMD clinicians warn against relying on the “string of beads” angiography for a diagnosis. In fact, it is suggested that FMD may be both under and over-diagnosed in children with stroke.

Treatment
There is no known cure for FMD. However, treatment focuses on relieving associated symptoms. Medical management is the most common form of treatment. The best approach to medically managing these patients is constantly being re-evaluated as more information is learned about the disease.

Kidney treatment
Blood pressure control is the primary concern when treating patients with renal FMD since the ideal blood pressure target in patients with FMD is unknown. In cases of renal artery stenosis and indications for intervention, percutaneous balloon angioplasty may be recommended. Many studies have assessed the success rate of percutaneous transluminal angioplasty (PTA) in these cases, and have found relief of hypertensive symptoms. Duplex ultrasonography should be performed soon after this procedure to ensure adequate renal velocities.

Stents have a restenosis rate of 10-20%, and may make surgical revascularization more difficult. Surgical revascularization may be necessary if aneurysms develop within the affected artery or if PTA does not resolve the issue.

Ex vivo renal artery reconstruction is sometimes used for complex diseases where branches of the renal artery are affected.

Cerebrovascular treatment
Patients with carotid or vertebral FMD should be medically managed to reduce the risk of a stroke. Aspirin 81 mg is typically prescribed for patients with carotid FMD. Antiplatelets and anticoagulants may be used to reduce the risk of blood clot formation. If a TIA or stroke are to occur, percutaneous angioplasty and antiplatelet therapy may be necessary. Pulsatile tinnitus is recognized as a common manifestation in 32% of US cerebrovascular FMD patients and sound or cognitive behavioral therapy may be helpful for some patients with more severe symptoms.

Treatment for FMD in other regions
Little information is known regarding the best treatment for FMD outside of the renal and extracranial regions. If claudication or limb ischemia is consequent to FMD in the extremities, angioplasty may be implemented.

Children
Pediatric FMD medical and surgical treatments or interventions are available. Treatment is determined by factors such as age and disease location but routinely involve controlling hypertension, re-establishing vascular flow, clot prevention, and improving lifestyle such as diet, exercise and smoking cessation. Medical therapy for pediatric population may involve the use of angiotensin-converting enzyme inhibitor (ACE inhibitors) and/or angiotensin II receptor blockers, multiple anti-hypertensive medications, diuretics, calcium channel blockers, and beta-blockers. Prevention of thrombosis of affected arteries may be taken through administration of an antiplatelet medication such as aspirin.

Percutaneous transluminal renal angioplasty (PTRA) remains the gold standard for renal-artery FMD. This treatment is useful when hypertension is difficult to control; patient is intolerant to the anti-hypertensive medications, non-complainant to medication regime and patient loss of renal volume due to ischemia. PTRA can also aid in preventing a lifelong dependency on medication for such a young patient. According to Meyers, “effective PTRAs result in cured or controlled blood pressure, which is often signified by reductions in plasma renin activity and angiotensin II levels, and when compared with surgery, percutaneous balloon angioplasty is less costly, able to be performed on an outpatient basis, results in lower morbidity, and the use of stenting is not primarily necessary.”  However, there is a subset of the pediatric population that is resistant to PTRA. Adverse events may include, “recurrent stenosis, arterial occlusion with renal loss, and arterial rupture with extravasations and pseudo aneurysm formation and may require surgical intervention.

Prognosis
Prognosis and outcome research is scant. In some cases, if not managed properly FMD-related aneurysms can occur causing bleeding into the brain, resulting in a stroke, permanent nerve damage, or death. Shedding light on the importance of detection and seeking appropriate care in reference to outcomes. What we do know is patients with multi-focal fibroplasia generally have a favorable prognosis. However, those who present with FMD in multiple vascular beds, or focal disease involving multiple branches of the renal arteries may develop renal artery dissection  or progressive renal impairment. Therefore, having a more difficult and complex prognostic course. There are presently no specific studies or reports on the long-term prognosis and outcome of FMD in children.

References

Citations
 Baert AL, Wilms G, Amery A, Vermylen J, Suy R. Percutaneous transluminal renal angioplasty: initial results and long-term follow-up in 202 patients. Cardiovasc Int Radiol. 1990;13;22-28
 Tegtmeyer CJ, Selby JB, Hartweel GD, Ayers C, Tegtmeyer V. Results and complications of angioplasty in Fibromuscular disease. Circulation. 1991;83(suppl);I-155-I-161.
 Mettiger KL, Ericson K. Fibromuscular dysplasia and the brain – observations on angiographic, clinical and genetic characteristics. Stroke. 1982;13;46-52.
 Schievink WI. Spontaneous dissection of the carotid and vertebral arteries. N Engl J Med. 2001;344;898-906.

External links 

Vascular diseases
Rare diseases